The Yamaguchi Patriots is a professional basketball team that competes in the Japanese B.League.

Roster

Notable players

Morgan Hikaru Aiken
Robert Sampson (basketball)

Coaches
John Saintignon

Arenas
Ube Tawaradao Memorial Gymnasium

References

 
Basketball teams established in 2020
Basketball teams in Japan
2020 establishments in Japan